Chatrapathi is a 2005 Indian Telugu-language action drama film co-written and directed by S. S. Rajamouli and produced by B. V. S. N. Prasad. The film stars Prabhas and Shriya Saran while Shafi, Bhanupriya, and Pradeep Rawat play supporting roles. Aarthi Agarwal and Mumaith Khan made a guest appearance.

The film released on 29 September 2005. It collected an estimated distributors' share of 22 crore ($5 million) against a budget of 12.5 crore ($2.8 million). The film won two Nandi Awards - Best Supporting Actress for Bhanupriya and Best Music Director for M. M. Keeravani. The film was remade in Bengali as Refugee (2006), and in Kannada with the same name in 2013. A Hindi remake with the same title began its production in 2021.

Plot
Sivaji and Ashok are the sons of Parvati. Sivaji is her stepson, but Parvati shows equal affection for both of them. This is not liked by Ashok, her biological son. They are one of the families living on the coast of Sri Lanka. One day, these villagers are forced to evacuate the coast. By Ashok's dislike on Sivaji, he lies to his mother that Sivaji died in the fire that was burning everything. Then, he is separated from his family. He ends up in a different boat and lands in Vizag port. He is brought up in the port itself, but his search for his mother never ceases. In that process, he comes across Neelu. Here, the port is dominated by Baji Rao and some goons using refugee labor for their own gain. Sivaji is an aggressive guy but is controlled by his well-wishers. One day, he reacts aggressively in defense of himself and the other refugees. People start calling him Chatrapathi. Meanwhile, Ras Bihari comes down to Vizag in the hunt for Sivaji since he killed his brother Baji Rao. Ashok, too lands in the same place. Realizing that Sivaji is his brother, he joins hands with the bad guys. The story is then of Chatrapathi, who is searching for his mother, and has a bunch of bad guys, including his brother, on his back while the entire port looks up to him.

Cast

 Prabhas as Sivaji / Chatrapathi
 Manoj Nandam as Young Sivaji 
 Shriya Saran as Neelu
 Bhanupriya as Parvati, Sivaji's stepmother and Ashok's biological mother
 Shafi as Ashok, Sivaji's stepbrother / Akash
 Master Sajja Teja as Young Ashok
 Pradeep Rawat as Ras Bihari
 Narendra Jha as Baji Rao 
 Kota Srinivasa Rao as Appala Nayudu
 Ajay as Ajay
 Kamal Kamaraju as Shivaji's friend
 Supreeth as Katraju
 Venu Madhav as Mahesh Nanda
 Jaya Prakash Reddy as Commissioner
 Surya as Syed Jaffar Khan
 Subbaraya Sharma as Commissioner's assistant
 Srinivas Reddy as Appala Nayudu's assistant
 L. B. Sriram as Sivaji's Neighbour
 Jeeva as boat Agent
 Stunt Silva
 Karate Kalyani as Fisherwoman
 Sekhar as Bhadram
 SS Kanchi as Clerk in Commissioner's Office
 Raghava as Dr. Vihari
 Y. Vijaya
 Anita Chowdary
 Mumaith Khan special appearance in the item song "Mannela Tintivira"
 Aarthi Agarwal special appearance in the song "Summa Masuriyaaa"

Themes
In an interview with Idlebrain.com, Rajamouli described Chatrapathi as a "mother sentiment film", which also deals with the exploitation faced by immigrants who come to India from the places far away and live without any official identity. When questioned about similarities to the American film Scarface, he said that his father V. Vijayendra Prasad, who wrote Chatrapathi, watched Scarface got inspired by the point of immigrants' problems, but there were no scenic resemblances between the two films.

Soundtrack

The film has seven songs composed by M. M. Keeravani. The track Gundusoodi has been reused from the song Kambangaadu from the Tamil movie Vaaname Ellai (1992) also composed by M. M. Keeravani. The song Agni Skalana was inspired from the Main Theme of the video game Myst IV: Revelation (2004) composed by Jack Wall.

Reception

Critical reception 
A reviewer from The Hindu felt that though the storyline was routine, its screenplay and direction that did the trick for the film. Sify rated the film 2/5  and wrote, "a swell cast with a young action hero and add a dash of digital wizardry to the stunts and cook up an unimaginative script as an aftermath and serve it piping hot! Chatrapati works to a certain extent thanks to the tall handsome hunk Prabhas." Jeevi of Idlebrain.com observed the film's similarities with Scarface and Deewaar but opined that Chatrapati stands on its own.

Box office
The film had a 100-day run in 54 venues.

Awards and nominations

Dubbed versions and remakes
The film was dubbed and released in Tamil as Chandramouli (2013), Malayalam as Chatrapathi (2011) and in Hindi as Hukumat Ki Jung (2009).

The film was remade in Bengali as Refugee (2006) starring Prosenjit and Rambha, and in Kannada with the same name in 2013, with Siddhanth and Priyadarshini.  It will be remade in Hindi with Bellamkonda Sreenivas making his debut in Hindi cinema.

Notes

References

External links
 

2005 films
2000s Telugu-language films
2005 action drama films
Films scored by M. M. Keeravani
Telugu films remade in other languages
Films directed by S. S. Rajamouli
Indian action drama films
Films about Indian slavery
Films about social issues in India
Films shot in Visakhapatnam